Tenali revenue division is an administrative division in the Guntur district of the Indian state of Andhra Pradesh. It comprises 8 mandals and is one of the two revenue divisions in the district, along with Guntur. Tenali serves as the headquarters of the division.

Administration 

The mandals in Tenali revenue division include:

See also 
List of revenue divisions in Andhra Pradesh

References 

Revenue divisions in Guntur district